Eremias lineolata (commonly known as the striped racerunner) is a species of lizard found in Kazakhstan, Turkmenistan, Tajikistan, Uzbekistan, Iran, and Afghanistan.

References

Eremias
Reptiles described in 1897
Taxa named by Alexander Nikolsky